Manchester Gorton by-election may refer to 

 1889 Gorton by-election
 1937 Manchester Gorton by-election
 1942 Manchester Gorton by-election
 1967 Manchester Gorton by-election
 2017 Manchester Gorton by-election